Thomas Arthur Jones (born November 17, 1940) is an American politician and a Democratic member of the South Dakota Senate representing District 17 since January 8, 2013. Jones served consecutively in the South Dakota Legislature from January 11, 2011 until January 8, 2013 in the South Dakota House of Representatives District 17 seat.

Elections
2012 When incumbent Senate District 17 Democratic Senator Eldon Nygaard left the Legislature and left the District 17 seat open, Jones was unopposed for the June 5, 2012 Democratic Primary and won the November 6, 2012 General election with 4,754 votes (52.4%) against Republican nominee John Chicoine.
2008 To challenge House District 17 incumbent Republican Representative Jamie Boomgarden, Jones ran in the four-way June 3, 2008 Democratic Primary but placed third behind incumbent Representative Eldon Nygaard and former state Senator John Reedy; in the four-way November 4, 2008 General election Republican Representative Boomgarden took the first seat and Representative Nygaard took the second seat ahead of Democratic former Senator Reedy and Republican nominee Roger Tigert, who had replaced John Lang on the ballot for the General election.
2010 When House District 17 incumbent Democratic Representative Nygaard ran for South Dakota Senate, Jones ran in the June 8, 2010 Democratic Primary; in the four-way November 2, 2010 General election incumbent Republican Representative Boomgarden took the first seat and Jones took the second seat with 3,575 votes (27.43%) ahead of Republican nominee Ron Nelson and fellow Democratic nominee Patricia Norin, who had run for the seat in 2006.

References

External links
Official page at the South Dakota Legislature
 

Place of birth missing (living people)
1940 births
Living people
Democratic Party members of the South Dakota House of Representatives
People from Viborg, South Dakota
Democratic Party South Dakota state senators